Cultural appropriation is the inappropriate or unacknowledged adoption of an element or elements of one culture or identity by members of another culture or identity. This can be especially controversial when members of a dominant culture appropriate from minority cultures. According to critics of the practice, cultural appropriation differs from acculturation, assimilation, or equal cultural exchange in that this appropriation is a form of colonialism. When cultural elements are copied from a minority culture by members of a dominant culture, and these elements are used outside of their original cultural context – sometimes even against the expressly stated wishes of members of the originating culture – the practice is often received negatively.

Cultural appropriation is considered harmful by various groups and individuals, including Indigenous people working for cultural preservation, those who advocate for collective intellectual property rights of the originating, minority cultures, and those who have lived or are living under colonial rule. Cultural appropriation can include exploitation of another culture's religious and cultural traditions, dance steps, fashion, symbols, language, and music.

Those who see this appropriation as exploitative state that cultural elements are lost or distorted when they are removed from their originating cultural contexts, and that such displays are disrespectful or even a form of desecration. Cultural elements that may have deep meaning to the original culture may be reduced to "exotic" fashion or toys by those from the dominant culture. Kjerstin Johnson has written that, when this is done, the imitator, "who does not experience that oppression is able to 'play', temporarily, an 'exotic' other, without experiencing any of the daily discriminations faced by other cultures". The black American academic, musician and journalist Greg Tate argued that appropriation and the "fetishising" of cultures, in fact, alienates those whose culture is being appropriated.

The concept of cultural appropriation has also been subject to heavy criticism and debate. Critics note that the concept is often misunderstood or misapplied by the general public, and that charges of "cultural appropriation" are at times misapplied to situations such as trying food from a different culture or learning about different cultures. Others state that the act of cultural appropriation as it is usually defined does not meaningfully constitute social harm, or the term lacks conceptual coherence. Additionally, the term can set arbitrary limits on intellectual freedom, artists' self-expression, reinforce group divisions, or promote a feeling of enmity or grievance rather than of liberation.

Overview 

Cultural appropriation can involve the use of ideas, symbols, artifacts, or other aspects of human-made visual or non-visual culture. As a concept that is controversial in its applications, the propriety of cultural appropriation has been the subject of much debate. Opponents of cultural appropriation view many instances as wrongful appropriation when the subject culture is a minority culture or is subordinated in social, political, economic, or military status to the dominant culture or when there are other issues involved, such as a history of ethnic or racial conflict. Linda Martín Alcoff writes that this is often seen in cultural outsiders' use of an oppressed culture's symbols or other cultural elements, such as music, dance, spiritual ceremonies, modes of dress, speech, and social behaviour when these elements are trivialized and used for fashion, rather than respected within their original cultural context. Opponents view the issues of colonialism, context, and the difference between appropriation and mutual exchange as central to analyzing cultural appropriation. They argue that mutual exchange happens on an "even playing field", whereas appropriation involves pieces of an oppressed culture being taken out of context by a people who have historically oppressed those they are taking from, and who lack the cultural context to properly understand, respect, or utilize these elements.

Another view of cultural appropriation is that calling upon it to criticise is "a deeply conservative project", despite progressive roots, that "first seeks to preserve in formaldehyde the content of an established culture and second tries [to] prevent others from interacting with that culture". For example, the film Star Wars used elements from Akira Kurosawa's The Hidden Fortress, which itself used elements from Shakespeare; culture in the aggregate is arguably better off for each instance of appropriation. Fusion between cultures has produced such foods as American Chinese cuisine, modern Japanese sushi, and bánh mì, each of which is sometimes argued to reflect part of its respective culture's identity.

Academic study 

The Oxford English Dictionarys earliest citation for the phrase was a 1945 essay by Arthur E. Christy which discussed Orientalism. The term became wide-spread in the 1980s, in discussions of post-colonial critiques of Western expansionism, though the concept of "cultural colonialism" had been explored earlier, such as in "Some General Observations on the Problems of Cultural Colonialism" by Kenneth Coutts‐Smith in 1976.

Cultural and racial theorist George Lipsitz has used the term "strategic anti-essentialism" to refer to the calculated use of a cultural form, outside of one's own, to define oneself or one's group. Strategic anti-essentialism can be seen in both minority cultures and majority cultures, and is not confined only to the use of the other. However, Lipsitz argues, when the majority culture attempts to strategically anti-essentialize itself by appropriating a minority culture, it must take great care to recognize the specific socio-historical circumstances and significance of these cultural forms so as not to perpetuate the already existing majority vs. minority unequal power relations.

Examples

Art, literature, iconography, and adornment 

Authentic Native American war bonnets are sacred, ceremonial items, earned by people of high status in a traditional, tribal societymuch like military medals. People from cultures who have this sacred regalia consider it very offensive when someone who has not earned the right to wear one dons an authentic or imitation headdresswhether as part of pretending to be Native American, or as a costume or fashion statement.

A common example of cultural appropriation is the adoption of the iconography of another culture, and using it for purposes that are unintended by the original culture or even offensive to that culture's mores. Examples include sports teams using Native American tribal names or images as mascots; people not from the originating culture wearing jewelry or fashion that incorporates religious symbols such as the medicine wheel, or wearing items of deep cultural significance and status that must be earned, such as a war bonnet, without having earned the right. Copying iconography from another culture's history such as Polynesian tribal tattoos, Chinese characters, or Celtic art worn without regard to their original cultural significance may also be considered appropriation. Critics of the practice of cultural appropriation contend that divorcing this iconography from its cultural context or treating it as kitsch risks offending people who venerate and wish to preserve their cultural traditions.

In Australia, Aboriginal artists have discussed an "authenticity brand" to ensure consumers are aware of artworks claiming false Aboriginal significance. The movement for such a measure gained momentum after the 1999 conviction of John O'Loughlin for selling paintings that he falsely described as the work of Aboriginal artist Clifford Possum Tjapaltjarri. In Canada, visual artist Sue Coleman has garnered negative attention for appropriating and amalgamating styles of Indigenous art into her work. Coleman, who has been accused of "copying and selling Indigenous-style artwork" has described herself as a "translator" of Indigenous art forms, which drew further criticism. In his open letter to Coleman, Kwakwak'awakw/Salish Artist Carey Newman stressed the importance of artists being accountable within the Indigenous communities as the antidote to appropriation.

Historically, some of the most hotly debated cases of cultural appropriation have occurred in places where cultural exchange is the highest, such as along the trade routes in southwestern Asia and southeastern Europe. Some scholars of the Ottoman Empire and ancient Egypt argue that Ottoman and Egyptian architectural traditions have long been falsely claimed and praised as Persian or Arab.

Religion and spirituality 

Many Native Americans have criticized what they deem to be the cultural appropriation of their sweat lodge and vision quest ceremonies by non-Natives, and even by tribes who have not traditionally had these ceremonies. They contend that there are serious safety risks whenever these events are conducted by those who lack the many years of training and cultural immersion required to lead them safely, mentioning the deaths or injuries in 1996, 2002, 2004, and several high-profile deaths in 2009.

Fashion 

Cultural appropriation is controversial in the fashion industry due to the belief that some trends commercialise and cheapen the ancient heritage of Indigenous cultures. There is debate about whether designers and fashion houses understand the history behind the clothing they are taking from different cultures, besides the ethical issues of using these cultures' shared intellectual property without consent, acknowledgement, or compensation. According to Minh-Ha T. Pham writing for The Atlantic, accusations of cultural appropriation are often defended as cultural appreciation, instead.

17th century to Victorian era 

The necktie or cravat was derived from a scarf worn by Croatian mercenaries fighting for Louis XIII, and the brightly colored silk waistcoats popularised by Charles II of England were inspired by Turkish, Indian and Persian attire acquired by wealthy English travellers.

During the Victorian era, the British aristocracy appropriated traditional Highland dress after the forced removal of the indigenous population during the Highland clearances. Tartan was given the spurious association with specific Highland clans after publications such as James Logan's romanticised work The Scottish Gael (1831) led the Scottish tartan industry to invent clan tartans and tartan became a desirable material for dresses, waistcoats, and cravats. In America, plaid flannel had become workwear by the time of Westward expansion, and was widely worn by Old West pioneers and cowboys who were not of Scottish descent. In the 21st century, tartan remains ubiquitous in mainstream fashion.

By the 19th century, the fascination had shifted to Asian culture. English Regency era dandies adapted the Indian churidars into slim fitting pantaloons, and frequently wore turbans within their own houses. Later, Victorian gentlemen wore smoking caps based on the Islamic fez, and fashionable turn of the century ladies wore Orientalist Japanese inspired kimono dresses. During the tiki culture fad of the 1950s, white women frequently donned the qipao to give the impression that they had visited Hong Kong, although the dresses were frequently made by seamstresses in America using rayon rather than genuine silk. At the same time, teenage British Teddy Girls wore Chinese coolie hats due to their exotic connotations.

In Mexico, the sombrero associated with the mestizo peasant class was adapted from an earlier hat introduced by the Spanish colonials during the 18th century. This, in turn, was adapted into the cowboy hat worn by American cowboys after the US Civil War. In 2016, the University of East Anglia prohibited the wearing of sombreros to parties on campus, in the belief that these could offend Mexican students, a move that was widely criticized.

American Western wear was copied from the work attire of 19th century Mexican Vaqueros, especially the pointed cowboy boots and the guayabera which was adapted into the embroidered Western shirt. The China poblana dress associated with Mexican women was appropriated from the choli and lehenga worn by Indian maidservants like Catarina de San Juan who arrived from Asia from the 17th century onwards.

Modern era 

In Britain, the rough tweed cloth clothing of the Irish, English, and Scottish peasantry, including the flat cap and Irish hat were appropriated by the upper classes as the British country clothing worn for sports such as hunting or fishing, in imitation of the then Prince of Wales. The country clothing, in turn, was appropriated by the wealthy American Ivy League and later preppy subcultures during the 1950s and 1980s due to both its practicality and its association with the English elite. During the same period the British comedian Tommy Cooper was known for wearing a Fez throughout his performances.

When keffiyehs became popular in the late 2000s, experts made a clear distinction between the wearing of a genuine scarf, and a fake made in China. Palestinian independence activists and socialists denounced the wearing of scarves not made in Palestine as a form of cultural appropriation, but encouraged fellow Muslims and progressively minded non-Muslim students to buy shemaghs made in the Herbawi factory to demonstrate solidarity with the Palestinian people and improve the economy of the West Bank. In 2017, Topshop caused controversy by selling Chinese-made playsuits that imitated the pattern of the keffiyeh.

Several fashion designers and models have featured imitations of Native American warbonnets in their fashion shows, such as Victoria's Secret in 2012, when model Karlie Kloss wore one during her walk on the runway; a Navajo Nation spokesman called it a "mockery". Cherokee academic Adrienne Keene wrote in The New York Times:

Both Victoria's Secret and Kloss issued apologies stating that they had no intentions of offending anyone.

The culturally significant Hindu festival, Holi, has been imitated and incorporated into fashion globally. For example, pop artist Pharrell Williams and Adidas collaborated in 2018 to create the Holi-inspired apparel and shoe line, "Hu Holi." The collection was stated to be a "trivialization of traditions-concepts-symbols-beliefs of Hinduism," according to Raja Zed, president of the Universal Society of Hinduism. The collection included many items which contained leather, a violation of Hindu beliefs.

Archbishop Justin Welby of the Anglican Church said that the crucifix is "now just a fashion statement and has lost its religious meaning". Crucifixes have been incorporated into Japanese lolita fashion by non-Christians in a cultural context that is distinct from its original meaning as a Christian religious symbol.

In 2018, Gucci designers were criticised for sending white models for a catwalk at Milan fashion week wearing a Sikh religious headpiece. Thousands of members from the Sikh community shared anger and disappointment that the brand had used Sikh sacred religious symbol for profit. Traditionally in Sikhism, a turban is worn by both men and women as a symbol of piety, honour, and spirituality, however, many people from Sikh community, including Avan Jogia, found it "offensive" and "irresponsible" for a white model wearing a turban.

Hairstyles, makeup, and body modifications 

 The leaders of ancient Israel condemned the adoption of Egyptian and Canaanite practices, especially cutting the hair short or shaving the beard. At the same time, the Old Testament distinguishes the religious circumcision of the Hebrews from cultures, such as the Egyptians, where the practice had aesthetic or practical purposes.
 During the early 16th century, European men imitated the short regular haircuts and beards on rediscovered Ancient Greek and Roman statues. The curled hair favoured by the Regency era dandy Beau Brummel was also inspired by the classical era.
 During the 17th century, Louis XIV began wearing wigs to conceal his baldness. Like many other French fashions, these were quickly appropriated by baroque era courtiers in England and the rest of Europe, to the extent that men often shaved their heads to ensure their wig fitted properly.
 American soldiers during World War II appropriated the Mohawk hairstyle of the Native American tribe of the same name to intimidate their enemies. These were later worn by 1950s jazz musicians like Sonny Rollins, and the 1980s punk subculture.
 During the early 2000s, it was popular in the West to get tribal tattoos appropriated from African and Polynesian culture, as well as earlobe piercings known as plugs, famously associated with the Buddha.
 There is debate about non-black people wearing dreadlocksa hairstyle many associate with African and African diaspora cultures such as Jamaican Rastafariand whether their doing so is cultural appropriation. In 2016 a viral video was published of a young black student arguing with a young white student and accusing him of cultural appropriation. In 2018, white actor Zac Efron was accused of cultural appropriation, when he posted a picture of himself in dreadlocks.
 There is debate regarding whether or not non-European or non-European-descended people wearing blonde wigs or straightening their hair is cultural appropriation, specifically within the African-American community.

Sports 

While the history of colonization and marginalization is not unique to the Americas, the practice of non-Native sports teams deriving team names, imagery, and mascots from Indigenous peoples is still common in the United States and Canada and has persisted in some extent despite protests from Indigenous groups. Cornel Pewewardy, Professor and Director of Indigenous Nations Studies at Portland State University, cites Indigenous mascots as an example of dysconscious racism which, by placing images of Native American or First Nations people into an invented media context, continues to maintain the superiority of the dominant culture. It is argued that such practices maintain the power relationship between the dominant culture and the Indigenous culture, and can be seen as a form of cultural imperialism.

Such practices may be seen as particularly harmful in schools and universities that have a stated purpose of promoting ethnic diversity and inclusion. In recognition of the responsibility of higher education to eliminate behaviors that create a hostile environment for education, in 2005 the NCAA initiated a policy against "hostile and abusive" names and mascots that led to the change of many derived from Native American culture, with the exception of those that established an agreement with particular tribes for the use of their specific names. Other schools retain their names because they were founded for the education of Native Americans, and continue to have a significant number of Indigenous students. The trend towards the elimination of Indigenous names and mascots in local schools has been steady, with two-thirds having been eliminated over the past 50 years according to the National Congress of American Indians (NCAI).

In contrast, the Seminole Tribe of Florida, in what the Washington Post called an unusual move, approved of the Florida State Seminoles use of their historical leader, Osceola, and his Appaloosa horse as the mascots Osceola and Renegade. After the NCAA attempted to ban the use of Native American names and iconography in college sports in 2005, the Seminole Tribe of Florida passed a resolution offering explicit support for FSU's depiction of aspects of Florida Seminole culture and Osceola as a mascot. The university was granted a waiver, citing the close relationship with, and ongoing consultation between, the team and the Florida tribe. In 2013, the tribe's chairman objected to outsiders meddling in tribal approval, stating that the FSU mascot and use of Florida State Seminole iconography "represents the courage of the people who were here and are still here, known as the Unconquered Seminoles". Conversely, in 2013, the Seminole Nation of Oklahoma expressed disapproval of "the use of all American Indian sports-team mascots in the public school system, by college and university level and by professional sports teams". Additionally, not all members of the Florida State Seminoles are supportive of the stance taken by their leadership on this issue.

In other former colonies in Asia, Africa, and South America, the adoption of Indigenous names for majority Indigenous teams is also found. There are also ethnically-related team names derived from prominent immigrant populations in the area, such as the Boston Celtics, the Notre Dame Fighting Irish, and the Minnesota Vikings.

The 2018 Commonwealth Games named its mascot Borobi, the local Yugambeh word for "koala", and has sought to trademark the word through IP Australia. The application is being opposed by a Yugambeh cultural heritage organisation, which argues that the Games' organising committee used the word without proper consultation with the Yugambeh people.

African-American culture 

The term wigger (common spelling "wigga") is a slang term for a white person who adopts the mannerisms, language, and fashions associated with African-American culture, particularly hip hop, and, in Britain, the grime scene, often implying the imitation is being done badly, although usually with sincerity rather than mocking intent. Wigger is a portmanteau of white and nigger or nigga, and the related term wangsta is a mashup of wannabe or white, and gangsta. Among black hip-hop fans, the word "nigga" can sometimes be considered a friendly greeting, but when used by white people as well as non-black people of color, it is usually viewed as offensive. Wigger may be derogatory, reflecting stereotypes of African-American, black British, and white culture (when used as a synonym of white trash). The term is sometimes used by other white people to belittle the person perceived as "acting black", but it is widely used by African Americans like 50 Cent offended by the wigga's perceived demeaning of black people and culture.

The phenomenon of white people adopting elements of black culture has been prevalent at least since slavery was abolished in the Western world. The concept has been documented in the United States, Canada, the United Kingdom, Australia, and other white-majority countries. An early form of this was the white negro in the jazz and swing music scenes of the 1920s and 1930s, as examined in the 1957 Norman Mailer essay "The White Negro". It was later seen in the zoot suiter of the 1930s and 1940s, the hipster of the 1940s, the beatnik of the 1950s–1960s, the blue-eyed soul of the 1970s, and the hip hop of the 1980s and 1990s. In 1993, an article in the UK newspaper The Independent described the phenomenon of white, middle-class kids who were "wannabe Blacks". The year 2005 saw the publication of Why White Kids Love Hip Hop: Wangstas, Wiggers, Wannabes, and the New Reality of Race in America by Bakari Kitwana, "a culture critic who's been tracking American hip hop for years".

Robert A. Clift's documentary Blacking Up: Hip-Hop's Remix of Race and Identity questions white enthusiasts of black hip-hop culture. Clift's documentary examines "racial and cultural ownership and authenticitya path that begins with the stolen blackness seen in the success of Stephen Foster, Al Jolson, Benny Goodman, Elvis Presley, the Rolling Stones up to Vanilla Ice ... and Eminem". A review of the documentary refers to the wiggers as "white poseurs", and states that the term wigger "is used both proudly and derisively to describe white enthusiasts of black hip-hop culture".

African Americans have been accused of cultural appropriation by people from Africa. This has been disputed, as members of the diaspora have claimed a link to Africa, but those from Africa have disputed it.

The term "blackfishing" was popularised in 2018 by writer Wanna Thompson, describing female white social media influencers who adopt a look perceived to be associated with black people including braided hair, dark skin from tanning or make-up, full lips, and large thighs. Critics argue they take attention and opportunities from black influencers by appropriating their aesthetics and have likened the trend to blackface. Florida State University's Alisha Gaines, author of Black for a Day: Fantasies of Race and Empathy, said blackfishing allowed non-Black people to appropriate what is commonly considered "cool" about Blackness while still avoiding the negative consequences, such as "racism and state violence". According to Health.com, it is related to, but an 'inverse form' of, passing.

Indigenous cultures 

Among critics, the misuse and misrepresentation of indigenous cultures are seen as an exploitative form of colonialism, and one step in the destruction of Indigenous cultures.

The results of this appropriation of Indigenous knowledge have led some tribes, and the United Nations General Assembly, to issue several declarations on the subject. The Declaration of War Against Exploiters of Lakota Spirituality includes the passage:

Article 31 1 of the United Nations Declaration on the Rights of Indigenous Peoples states:

In 2015, a group of Native American academics and writers stated the Rainbow Family members whose acts of "cultural exploitation... dehumanize us as an indigenous Nation because they imply our culture and humanity, like our land, is anyone's for the taking".

In writing about Indigenous intellectual property for the Native American Rights Fund (NARF), board member Professor Rebecca Tsosie stresses the importance of these property rights being held collectively, not by individuals:

South and East Asian cultures 

In 2016, pop star Beyoncé was widely criticized for wearing a sari and bindi in the music video for the Coldplay song "Hymn For The Weekend".

From 2020 to the present, there has been a persistent issue regarding the white adoption and convolution of Hindu (a religion originating from South Asia) religious practices, coining them with the umbrella term of "spirituality." These were practices, including the usage of the Evil Eye, Hamsa, etc. that people growing up as Hindus report being bullied for in their past, and even the present.

Martial arts 

In China, there is longstanding resentment of the Japanese schools of karate for stealing, imitating, and claiming credit for the forms of kung fu. Before the 1970s, most sifu disapproved of teaching kung fu to non-Chinese students. In the mid-20th century, Japanese karate was itself appropriated by American soldiers. As mixed martial arts gained popularity in the 21st century, practitioners have appropriated and combined Chinese, Japanese and Thai techniques with Western-style boxing, wrestling, and kickboxing.

Minority languages 

Use of minority languages has been cited as cultural appropriation, such as when non-speakers of Scottish Gaelic or Irish get tattoos in those languages, especially when they don't understand what their tattoos mean. Likewise, the use of incorrect Scottish Gaelic in a tokenistic fashion aimed at non-Gaelic speakers on signage and announcements has been criticized as disrespectful to fluent speakers of the language.

Since the early 2000s, it has become increasingly popular for people not of East Asian or South Asian descent to get tattoos of Devanagari, Korean letters, or Han characters (traditional, simplified or Japanese), often without knowing the actual meaning of the symbols being used.

Film and television 

In 2017, Ghost in the Shell, which is based on the seinen manga Ghost in the Shell by Masamune Shirow, provoked disputes over whitewashing. Scarlett Johansson, a white actress, took the role of Motoko Kusanagi, a Japanese character. This was seen as cultural appropriation by some Western fans of the original manga who expected the role to be taken by an Asian or Asian-American actor. However, Japanese fans' reaction ranged from neutral to warm feelings about Scarlett Johansson starring in the film, with some fans expressing the sentiment that it would be better to have an actress with no ties to Asia play the character than to have a non-Japanese Asian pretend to be Japanese.

Costumes 

During Halloween, some people buy, wear, and sell Halloween costumes based on cultural or racial stereotypes. There have been public protests calling for the end to the manufacture and sales of these costumes and connecting their "degrading" portrayals of Indigenous women to the Missing and Murdered Indigenous Women (MMIW) crisis. In some cases, theme parties have been held where attendees are encouraged to dress up as stereotypes of a certain racial group. A number of these parties have been held at colleges, and at times other than Halloween, including Martin Luther King Jr. Day and Black History Month. For example, non-Romani people wear Romani costumes despite Romani people experiencing everyday racism and stereotypes.

Boy Scouts of America-associated dance teams 

In chapter four of his book Playing Indian, Native American historian Philip J. Deloria refers to the Koshare Indian Museum and Dancers as an example of "object hobbyists" who adopt the material culture of Indigenous peoples of the past ("the vanishing Indian") while failing to engage with contemporary native peoples or acknowledge the history of conquest and dispossession. In the 1950s, the head councilman of the Zuni Pueblo saw a performance and said: "We know your hearts are good, but even with good hearts you have done a bad thing." In Zuni culture, religious objects, and practices are only for those that have earned the right to participate, following techniques and prayers that have been handed down for generations. In 2015, the Koshare's Winter Night dances were canceled after a late request was received from Cultural Preservation Office (CPO) of the Hopi Nation asking that the troop discontinue their interpretation of the dances of the Hopi and Pueblo Native Americans. Director of the CPO Leigh Kuwanwisiwma saw video of the performances online, and said the performers were "mimicking our dances, but they were insensitive, as far as I'm concerned". In both instances, unable to satisfy the concerns of the tribes and out of respect for the Native Americans, the Koshare Dance Team complied with the requests, removed dances found to be objectionable, and even went so far as to give items deemed culturally significant to the tribes. Subsequently the Koshare have resumed their performance schedule without having further communications with Native Americans.

The objections from some Native Americans towards such dance teams center on the idea that the dance performances are a form of cultural appropriation that places dance and costumes in inappropriate contexts devoid of their true meaning, sometimes mixing elements from different tribes. In contrast, the dance teams state that "[their] goal is to preserve Native American dance and heritage through the creation of dance regalia, dancing, and teaching others about the Native American culture".

Gender and sexuality 

People in the transgender community have protested against the casting of straight, cisgender actors in trans acting roles, such as when Eddie Redmayne played the role of artist Lili Elbe in the film The Danish Girl and when Jared Leto played the role of a trans woman named Rayon in Dallas Buyers Club. Some in the gay community have expressed concerns about the use of straight actors to play gay characters; this occurs in films such as Call Me by Your Name (straight actors Armie Hammer and Timothée Chalamet), Brokeback Mountain (Heath Ledger and Jake Gyllenhaal), Philadelphia (Tom Hanks), Capote (Philip Seymour Hoffman) and Milk (with Sean Penn playing the role of the real-life gay rights activist, Harvey Milk). In the other direction, gay actors playing straight roles, Andrew Haigh, the writer-director, said, "You rarely see a gay actor applauded for playing straight." Jay Caruso calls these controversies "wholly manufactured", on the grounds that the actors "are playing a role" using the "art of acting".

Some heterosexual individuals controversially self-identify by the oxymoron, "Queer heterosexual". As queer is generally defined either as a synonym for LGBT, or defined as "non-heterosexual", this appropriation of queer by cisgender, heterosexual individuals has been highly contested by LGBT people. One reason is that the term has a long history of use as a slur of LGBT people. LGBT people who consider this use of the term queer by heterosexual people to be inappropriate say that it is patently offensive because it involves members of the dominant culture, who do not experience oppression for their sexual orientation or gender identity, appropriating what they see as the fashionable parts of the terminology and identities of those who are oppressed for their sexuality.

Other uses 

The government of Ghana has been accused of cultural appropriation in adopting the Caribbean Emancipation Day and marketing it to African American tourists as an "African festival".

For some members of the South-Asian community, the wearing of a bindi dot as a decorative item by a non-Hindu can be seen as cultural appropriation, though other Hindus have disputed that view.

A term among Irish people for someone who imitates or misrepresents Irish culture is Plastic Paddy.

Responses 

In 2011, a group of students at Ohio University started a poster campaign denouncing the use of cultural stereotypes as costumes. The campaign features people of color alongside their respective stereotypes with slogans such as "This is not who I am and this is not okay." The goal of the movement was to raise awareness around racism during Halloween in the university and the surrounding community, but the images also circulated online.

"Reclaim the Bindi" has become a hashtag used by some people of South Asian descent who wear traditional garb, and object to its use by people not of their culture. At the 2014 Coachella Valley Music and Arts Festival one of the most noted fashion trends was the bindi, a traditional Hindu headmark. As pictures of the festival surfaced online there was public controversy over the casual wearing of the bindi by non-Hindu individuals who did not understand the meaning behind it. Reclaim the Bindi Week is an event which seeks to promote the traditional cultural significance of the bindi and combat its use as a fashion statement.

Criticism of the concept 

John McWhorter, a professor at Columbia University, criticized the concept in 2014, arguing that cultural borrowing and cross-fertilization is a generally positive thing and is something which is usually done out of admiration, and with no intent to harm the cultures being imitated; he also argued that the specific term "appropriation", which can mean theft, is misleading when applied to something like culture that is not seen by all as a limited resource. In 2018, conservative columnist Jonah Goldberg described cultural appropriation as a positive thing and dismissed opposition to it as a product of some people's desire to be offended. Kwame Anthony Appiah, ethics columnist for the New York Times, said that the term cultural appropriation incorrectly labels contemptuous behavior as a property crime. According to Appiah, "The key question in the use of symbols or regalia associated with another identity group is not: What are my rights of ownership? Rather it's: Are my actions disrespectful?"

In 2016, author Lionel Shriver said that authors from a cultural majority have a right to write in the voice of someone from a cultural minority, attacking the idea that this constitutes cultural appropriation. Referring to a case in which U.S. college students were facing disciplinary action for wearing sombreros to a "tequila party", she said: "The moral of the sombrero scandals is clear: you're not supposed to try on other people's hats. Yet that's what we're paid to do, isn't it? Step into other people's shoes, and try on their hats." Upon winning the 2019 Booker Prize, Bernardine Evaristo dismissed the concept of cultural appropriation, stating that it is ridiculous to demand of writers that they not "write beyond [their] own culture".

See also 

 Crossover music
 Cultural diffusion
 Cultural imperialism
 Enculturation
 Fusion cuisine
 Indigenous intellectual property
 Syncretism
 Xenocentrism
 Pizza effect
 World music
 Orientalism
 Outsider art
 Passing as Indigenous American
 Passing as African American and other races
 Pretendian
 Romantic racism
 Racial fetishism
 Exoticism
 Multiculturalism
 Racial misrepresentation
 Romani people

References

External links 

Cultural appropriation
Concepts in aesthetics
Concepts in epistemology
Concepts in political philosophy
Concepts in social philosophy
Criticism of multiculturalism
Appropriation
Intellectual property activism
Intellectual property law
Linguistic controversies
Race-related controversies